Talamanca may refer to:

Cordillera de Talamanca, a mountain range in Costa Rica and Panama
Kingdom of Talamanca, a former political entity in present day Costa Rica
Talamanca (canton), a canton in Limón, Costa Rica
Talamanca languages, branch of Chibchan languages spoken in Costa Rica and Panama
Talamanca (Bages), a municipality in Catalonia, Spain
Talamanca de Jarama, a municipality in Madrid, Spain
"Talamanca", a song by Burns (musician)
Alessandro Figà Talamanca, an Italian mathematician
Tommy Talamanca, an Italian musician

See also
Talamancan montane forests, ecoregion of the Cordillera